Glasgow Provan was a  burgh constituency represented in the House of Commons of the Parliament of the United Kingdom from 1955 until 1997. It elected one Member of Parliament (MP) using the first-past-the-post voting system.

Boundaries
1955–1974: The County of the City of Glasgow wards of Dennistoun and Provan.

1974–1983: The County of the City of Glasgow ward of Provan, and part of Shettleston and Tollcross ward.

1983–1997: The City of Glasgow District electoral divisions of Gartloch/Easterhouse, Lethamhill/Riddrie, and Queenslie/Barlanark.

Members of Parliament

Election results

Elections in the 1950s

Elections in the 1960s

Elections in the 1970s

Elections in the 1980s

Elections in the 1990s

References 

Historic parliamentary constituencies in Scotland (Westminster)
Constituencies of the Parliament of the United Kingdom established in 1955
Constituencies of the Parliament of the United Kingdom disestablished in 1997
Politics of Glasgow